The O.F. and Lulu E. Fryer House is a historic residence located in Fairfield, Iowa, United States.  Ode Franklin Fryer was a local banker.  This Prairie School house was built for him and his wife Lulu in 1920.  It was designed by Guy A. Carpenter, a local freelance architect.  The historic designation includes the house and the detached garage.  The two-story brick rectangular structure features a flat roof, a single-story solarium, a full-width porch, and a porte cochere.  A prominent feature of the house is its wide eaves.  The house was listed on the National Register of Historic Places in 1999.

References

Houses completed in 1920
Prairie School architecture in Iowa
Houses in Fairfield, Iowa
National Register of Historic Places in Jefferson County, Iowa
Houses on the National Register of Historic Places in Iowa